Stephen Ackles (born 15 February 1966), son of Norwegian mother (Bergliot Kittilsen) and American father (Allan Dale Ackles) is a beloved Norwegian vocalist, pianist, and songwriter who mainly play rock 'n' roll inspired by Jerry Lee Lewis, Chuck Berry, Little Richard, Elvis Presley with several. 
Ackles has worked with a number of world-renowned artists such as Sir Elton John, Carl Perkins, Tom Jones, Johnny Cash, Kris Kristofferson, Little Richard, Waylon Jennings, Jerry Lee Lewis, Linda Gail Lewis, James Burton and Narvel Felts
Ackles took part in the Norwegian final of "Melodi Grand Prix" in 1992, 1996 and 1999.

Discography

Album 
 1988  Stephen Ackles and The Memphis News 
 1990  I Ain't No Different Than You 
 1991  If This Ain't Music 
 1992  Hey You! 
 1993  Rarities Vol. 1 
 1993  Let's Keep the Night 
 1995  One for the Moon 
 1996  Rockin' My Life Away  (Live Album)
 1997  Hungry for life 
 1999  The Gospel According to... 
 2002  I Believe  
 2005  Stephen Ackles 
 2007  The Presley Project 
 2013  For More Than Only Tonight 
 2015  The Confidence Game

Eurovision contributions 
  1992  Det er lørdag og rock'n roll (It's Saturday and rock'n roll)
  1996  Jennina (Jennine)
  1999  Lost again

External links 
Stephen Ackles på Rockpedia.no 
Stephen Ackles på Myspace
The Official Stephen Ackles Fan Club of Norway

1966 births
Living people
Norwegian people of American descent
Musicians from Porsgrunn
Norwegian male singers
Norwegian singer-songwriters
English-language singers from Norway
Norwegian rock singers
Melodi Grand Prix contestants
Grappa Music artists
Norwegian country musicians
Norwegian male pianists
21st-century Norwegian pianists
21st-century Norwegian male musicians